Da'Love Woods (born September 7, 1982) is an American professional basketball player, in Europe. At 1.65 m (5 ft 5 in) in height, she plays at the point guard position.

College career
Born in Portland, Oregon, Woods played college basketball at the University of Portland and Colorado State University.  In 2001, as a freshman at the University of Portland, she broke the then West Coast Conference Tournament scoring record with 31 points.  As a sophomore, Woods went on to become a 1st-Team all West Coast Conference player in 2002.

Professional playing career
Woods began her European playing career in Switzerland for LNA club Esperance Sportive Pully in 2007.  There she averaged 34.8 points per game.  In 2004 and 2005 Woods was invited to the training camp of the Colorado Chill of the National Women's Basketball League.

Woods most recently played in Germany's DBBL for BBV Leipzig during the 2007-2008 season. She earned several EuroBasket awards while playing for BBV Leipzig, which included DBBL Guard of the Year.  Woods was also awarded 1st Team-DBBL and was a member of the DBBL All-Imports Team.  Woods finished the DBBL season as the league leader in points and assist, averaging 20.2 points per game and 6 assist per game.

Professional career
Woods is the owner of Deep Three Basketball which holds summer league basketball tournaments in her hometown of Portland, Oregon. Woods also acts as the league director of the Portland Women's Summer League (PWSL), a venture of the Deep Three Basketball company.

Notes

External links
 Player Profile - Agent's Page
 Eurobasket Player Page
 First Eagles Substitute
 Cukierki Odra Brzeg Player Page

1982 births
Living people
American expatriate basketball people in Germany
American expatriate basketball people in Poland
American expatriate basketball people in Switzerland
American women's basketball coaches
American women's basketball players
Basketball players from Portland, Oregon
Colorado State Rams women's basketball players
High school basketball coaches in the United States
Point guards
Portland Pilots women's basketball players
St. Mary's Academy (Portland, Oregon) alumni